Geronimo Stilton (also known as The New Adventures of Geronimo Stilton in season 3) is an animated children's television series based on the book series of the same name by Elisabetta Dami. The series is produced by Italian studios Atlantyca Entertainment and Rai Fiction, in co-production with French-American studio MoonScoop Group for the first two seasons and French studios Superprod Studio and Backup Media for season 3, with the participation of M6 for the first two seasons and France Télévisions for season 3, in association with B Media 2014 and Cofinova 5 for season 3.

The show ran for 78 episodes across three seasons, and it debuted on Rai 2 in Italy on September 15, 2009. The second season aired on October 24, 2011, and the third season on October 8, 2016, which the show ended on as of February 28, 2017.

Plot
Geronimo Stilton is about the titular character, a mouse journalist and head of the Geronimo Stilton Media Group. He searches New Mouse City and places around the world for new scoops while having adventures along the way with his nephew Benjamin, cousin Trap, sister Thea and Benjamin's friend Pandora Woz. Most episodes share no story connections and are generally self-contained, though some episodes feature ties and characters from others.

Episodes

Characters

Main
 Geronimo Stilton (voiced by Brian Drummond) is the publisher of The Rodent's Gazette, and also the president of the Geronimo Stilton Media Group. He is also the world chess champion after the events of the episode "Gem Gang". He is portrayed as slightly brave in the television series, even though in the books he was never depicted himself as valiant and has no glasses or vest under his jacket. Geronimo has a love of knowledge and has a sense of ethics and morals, but despite this he is still a bit of a klutz. He leads one of the most successful publication groups in the world. Geronimo stars in the book and television series alongside his younger sister Thea Stilton, his prankster cousin Trap Stilton, and his nephew Benjamin.
 Thea Stilton (voiced by Sarah Edmondson) is Geronimo's younger sister and the special correspondent for The Rodent's Gazette. For a time, Thea taught a journalism class at Whale Island University, and while there she met five mouselets; Pamela, Paulina, Violet, Colette, and Nicky who named themselves the Thea sisters, after their favorite teacher. She flies the team in her all-terrain Metamouse, which can turn into a submarine, boat, airship, rocket ship/moon rover and SUV truck to locations that Thea, Trap, Benjamin, and Geronimo are exploring for an articles in The Rodent's Gazette. Thea is always ready to jump into action. She also a professional in martial arts, sports and drives a motorcycle and a Helicopter which is also portrayed to the books.
 Trap Stilton (voiced by Richard Ian Cox) is Geronimo and Thea's cousin. He lives in a trailer located in a beautiful park and is an expert chef, yet none of the meals he cooks up are tasty to Geronimo. He travels along with Geronimo when he's called on. Trap is a joker and loves to play tricks on others, especially Geronimo who he considers to be gullible. Still, he has a big heart and doesn't play jokes to be mean. He is also easily frightened.
 Benjamin Stilton (voiced by Erin Mathews) is the 12-year-old nephew of Geronimo and Thea and is a hip near-genius at computers and electronics. He is dynamic and perk, although he can be impatient sometimes, and he loves skateboarding and sports. He works with his uncle at The Rodent's Gazette, running a computer news blog after school. He has a pet robot mouse named Max.
 Pandora Woz (voiced by Moneca Stori in season 1 and Monica Smouter in seasons 2–3) is Benjamin's best friend. She is very enthusiastic about the adventures Geronimo travels on, and she often comes along for the ride. She likes Thea because they share a similar high-spirited enthusiasm for life. Trap and Pandora also get along as well for both like to play pranks on Geronimo. She has a tendency to get distracted easily, which leads her into danger. Pandora also has a pet hamster, Mr. Nibbles. In the books, she is named "Bugsy Wugsy".

Recurring
Sally Ratmousen (voiced by Patricia Drake) is the main recurring antagonist of the series. She is the publisher of The Daily Rat, The Rodent's Gazette main competitor and rival. She is the primary cause of trouble for the Stilton crew when they are in New Mouse City, and she has a personal grudge against Geronimo.
Simon Squealer (voiced by Brian Drummond) works for The Daily Rat as the personal assistant of Sally. He would do any dirty business for Sally. Simon protects his job at all costs, and goes to great lengths to dig up dirt on some famous mouse in New Mouse City.
Chippy P. Crunchrat (voiced by David Kaye) is a very greedy and conniving businessman who is willing to do anything in his power to make his name in glory when his Chip franchise went downhill, and Geronimo Stilton has come across him several times and foiled his plots, but he usually escapes. He is the secondary main recurring antagonist from season two and onward, from kidnapping Geronimo (Chips and Dips) to causing national disasters in South America (Temple of the Dragons Gasp) to melting the Arctic circle (Pole Rat).
Professor von Volt (voiced by Lee Tockar) is a scientist, inventor, and an old friend of Geronimo. He invented Benjamin's Benpad and rebuilt his robotic mouse. He always stays in his lab to have some experiments and sometimes like to help Geronimo whenever he is free. He is a recurring character from inventing a time machine (The Cave Mouse) to a translating device (If I Could Talk to the Animals). He also invented many other such as the Mind Mingler (Trade off) and a copier (Double Trap).
Ratswami (voiced by Alistair Abell) is an antagonistic hypnotist for New Mouse City. He once hypnotized the people of New Mouse City in (Hypno-Tick Tock). He is one of the recurring characters in season one when he hypnotized Geronimo to be his servant, which he was framed as a suspect to an overnight robbery. He also hypnotized Geronimo's grandfather (William Shortpaws) to marry Sally so she can take over The Rodents Gazette (A Brief Engagement).
Prince Nogouda (voiced by Trevor Devall) is a germophobic antagonist who lives in a palace in the Bandell jungle. It is revealed in (Operation Shufongfong) that he captured rare animals from all over the world including two rare lizards. In (Clean Sweep) him and his guards captured Thea to marry him and be his Princess in order to save his wealth and riches before its too late.
Professor Cheesewheel (voiced by Scott McNeil) is a mad scientist and robotics inventor who had schemed to steal a technologically advanced airship (Mouse House of the Future), steal and sell the intelligence of the world's smartest people (Smarty Pants) and helping Crunchrat melt the Arctic circle (Pole Rat).
William Shortpaws (voiced by Scott McNeil) is Geronimo's grandfather, and former owner of The Rodents Gazette as he started his newspaper empire by selling newspapers as a child. Currently, he oversees Geronimo's operation of his company, and he knows exactly the way he wants things to be. Occasionally when Geronimo least expects it, he drops into The Rodent's Gazette to check on how he is doing even though he has retired.
Shadow (voiced by Kathleen Barr) is New Mouse City's most notorious thief and a master of disguise, and Geronimo has crossed paths against her when she was disguised as a mummy (The Mummy with No Name) and later working for Sally to get the scoop on a new fashion fabric (Top Model Thea).
Bree Cheeserind (voiced by Sam Vincent) is a big celebrity actor Pandora is obsessed with who has been in a few of Geronimo Stilton's adventures. He's also kind, generous and a nature lover, as shown in (Temple of the Dragon's Gasp), as he is against the destruction of the forest by Chippy P. Crunchrat.
Philipilino (voiced by Trevor Devall) is a very famous fashion designer who has crossed paths with Geronimo on some occasions.
King Liu Shi Mew (voiced by Sam Vincent) is a young and modern trend lifestyle king who is the royal highness of Whiskeristan and a very close and good friend with the Stiltons.
The Ratoff family who are distant relatives of the Stiltons that live in Transratania who meet up with them whenever they travel there.
The Rat-Jitsu Clan are a special group of martial artists and ninjas who are very close friends with Geronimo and his family in which they were also inducted into as members after saving their clan and Master Caretaker's life twice.

Production
Geronimo Stilton is produced by Atlantyca and Rai Fiction in Italy, MoonScoop Group in France for seasons 1-2, and Superprod and Back UP Media in France in season 3. On April 15, 2010, it was announced that the series would continue with a second season of 26 episodes, which premiered in Italy on October 24, 2011. A third season was announced on February 6, 2013, and on October 14, 2014, it was announced that France-based studios Superprod and Backup Media would help with the production, thus replacing the crew of MoonScoop Group.

The series was animated using Toon Boom Harmony. The animation was outsourced to Toon City Animation, Snipple Animation for seasons 1-2 and Top Draw Animation for season 3 located in the Philippines, and Dong Woo Animation for season 2 located in South Korea.

Release

Broadcast
Geronimo Stilton debuted on Rai 2 in Italy on September 15, 2009, and later the show premiered on Rai Gulp. The series aired on Ici Radio-Canada Télé and YTV in Canada, M6 in France, Cartoon Network in Spain, Okto in Singapore, Nickelodeon in the Netherlands, Belgium, Denmark, and Sweden, NTV7 in Malaysia,, Sun Network in India, Eleven in Australia in July, TVNZ in New Zealand, and TVB Pearl in Hong Kong. In the United States, the series was added to Kabillion's VOD service. In the United Kingdom and other countries in Europe, the series was streamed on the Nintendo 3DS on February 6, 2017. The third season debuted on Knowledge in Canada on June 30, 2018. The series is also available on Netflix. As of 2022, however, the show has been removed from Netflix. Currently, the first 2 seasons are available to watch on Amazon Prime Video.

Home media
Imavision released the first two seasons on DVD in both English and French in Canada between 2010 and 2013. Their successor, Unidisc, distributed the third season in 2017.

In the United States, Entertainment One released 16 episodes from the first season across four DVDs release between 2013 and 2015.

In Australia, the first season was spread across four DVD volumes and distributed by a joint venture by Universal & Sony Pictures Home Entertainment in 2014.

In 2013, the show's trailer was on YouTube Movies in both Canada and the USA, which showcased the season one collection as the well as the first episode (Operation Shufongfong).

Reception

Critical response
Emily Ashby of Common Sense Media rated Geronimo Stilton 4 out of 5 stars, stating the series "[engages] kids in characters who star in a TV show and a book series and giving families a reason to enjoy their stories in both formats together."

Awards and nominations

Trivia
 Geronimo doesn't have glasses in the series like he does in the books.

References

External links
 
 
 
 Geronimo Stilton on Rai Gulp

2009 American television series debuts
2017 American television series endings
2000s American animated television series
2010s American animated television series
2009 French television series debuts
2017 French television series endings
2000s French animated television series
2010s French animated television series
2009 Italian television series debuts
2017 Italian television series endings
2000s Italian television series
2010s Italian television series
American children's animated action television series
American children's animated adventure television series
American children's animated comedy television series
American television shows based on children's books
French children's animated action television series
French children's animated adventure television series
French children's animated comedy television series
French television shows based on children's books
Italian children's animated action television series
Italian children's animated adventure television series
Italian children's animated comedy television series
English-language television shows
Television series by Splash Entertainment
Animated television series about mice and rats